The 2003 Tour de Langkawi was the 8th edition of the Tour de Langkawi, a cycling stage race that took place in Malaysia. It began on 31 January in Langkawi and ended on 9 February in Kuala Lumpur. In fact, this race was rated by the Union Cycliste Internationale (UCI) as a 2.2 category race.

Tom Danielson of USA won the race, followed by Hernán Darío Muñoz of Colombia second and Fredy González of Colombia third. Graeme Brown of Australia won the points classification category and Roland Green of South Africa won the mountains classification category.  won the team classification category.

Stages
The cyclists competed in 10 stages, covering a distance of 1,343.5 kilometres. Due to the extreme weather conditions(heavy downpour) experienced during the Stage 10 of the 2003 Tour de Langkawi, the stage was neutralised according to the decision of the College of Commissaires and the Race Organizer. All competitors at the stage had been awarded the winner's time. However, the classification and the top three finalist of the stage had been awarded.

Classification leadership

Final standings

General classification

Points classification

Mountains classification

Asian rider classification

Team classification

Asian team classification

List of teams and riders
A total of 20 teams were invited to participate in the 2003 Tour de Langkawi. Out of the 138 riders, a total of 122 riders made it to the finish in Kuala Lumpur.

 
  Hernán Darío Muñoz
  Fredy González
  Russel Van Hout
  Ruber Marín
  Urbelino Mesa
  Mikhaylo Khalilov
  José Rujano
 
  Gabriele Missaglia
  Maximilian Sciandri
  Rubens Bertogliati
  Daniele Righi
  Marco Pinotti
  Luciano Pagliarini
  Marco Serpellini
 
  Santos González
  Miguel Ángel Martín Perdiguero
  Rubén Lobato
  Lorenzo Cardellini
  Filippo Simeoni
  Sergio Marinangeli
 
  Stuart O'Grady
  Christopher Jenner
  Corey Sweet
  Eric Leblacher
  Yohann Charpenteau
  Yan Tournier
 Team Fakta
  René Jørgensen
  Jørgen Bo Petersen
  Julian Winn
  Lars Bak
  Allan Bo Andresen
  Jacob Moe Rasmussen
  Bjørnar Vestøl

 Marlux-Ville De Charlerois
  Dave Bruylandts
  Christian Poos
  Raivis Belohvoščiks
  Johan Dekkers
  Guillaume Girout
  Charles Guilbert
  Sébastien Mattozza
 De Nardi-Colpack
  Andrus Aug
  Simone Cadamuro
  Michele Colleoni
  Ondrej Fadrny
  Andrea Rossi
  Charly Wegelius
  Michele Gobbi
 Telekom Malaysia
  Wong Kam-po
  Ghader Mizbani
  Thomas Evans
  Tonton Susanto
  Simone Mori
  Nor Effendy Rosli
  Tsen Seong Hoong
 
  Paolo Lanfranchi
  Graeme Brown
  Brett Lancaster
  Scott Davis
  Sergiy Matveyev
  Filippo Perfetto
  Guillermo Bongiorno
 Saturn
  Chris Horner
  Tom Danielson
  Charles Dionne
  Tim Johnson
  Nathan O'Neill
  Eric Wohlberg
  Phil Zajicek

 
  Josep Jufré
  David Fernández Domingo
  Nácor Burgos
  Oscar Laguna Garcia
  German Nieto Fernandez
  Jose Manuel Maestre
  José Manuel Vázquez Palomo
 Formaggi Pinzolo Fiave
  Biagio Conte
  Moreno Di Biase
  Fortunato Baliani
  Domenico Gualdi
  Luis Felipe Laverde
  Matteo Cappe
  Massimo Amichetti
 Flanders-iTeamNova
  Ronny Assez
  Jamie Drew
  Scott Guyton
  Allan Iacuone
  Jurgen Landrie
  David McKenzie
  Trent Wilson
 Malaysia
  Shahrulneeza Razali
  Wong Ah Thiam
  Mohd Mahadzir Hamad
  Musairi Musa
  Shahrizan Selamat
  Suhardi Hassan
  Mohd Sazlee Ismail
 Canada
  Roland Green
  Seamus McGrath
  Peter Wedge
  Cory Lange
  Alexandre Lavallée
  Gordon Fraser
  Bruno Langlois

 
  Thierry De Groote
  Kristof Trouve
  Hendrik Van Dyck
  Michel Van Haecke
  Erwin Thijs
  Peter Wuyts
  Gert Vanderaerden
 South Africa
  Malcolm Lange
  Simon Kessler
  Johan Van Der Berg
  Morné Bester
  Owen Hannie
  Ross Grant
  David George
 Japan
  Tomoya Kano
  Shinri Suzuki
  Hidenori Nodera
  Kazuya Okazaki
  Satoshi Hirose
  Koki Shimbo
  Koji Fukushima
 Philippines
  Victor Espiritu
  Arnel Quirimit
  Merculio Ramos
  Villamor Baluyut
  Enrique Domingo
  Warren Davadilla
  Lloyd Lucien Reynante
 Iran
  Ahad Kazemi
  Hossein Askari
  Alireza Haghi
  Mehdi Sohrabi
  Hassan Maleki
  Rasoul Farshbaf
  Sirous Hashemzadeh

References

2003
2003 in road cycling
2003 in Malaysian sport